Păcală (Romanian, from a păcăli, "to dupe"; sometimes rendered Pâcală or Pîcală) is a fictional character in Romanian folklore, literature and humor. An irreverent young man, seemingly a peasant, he reserves contempt and irony for the village authorities (whether priest, boyar or judge), but often plays the fool. Several derivative works codify the various versions of Păcală anecdotes. Examples include: Pâcală, by Ion Creangă; Păcală în satul lui ("Păcală in His Village") by Ioan Slavici; Isprăvile lui Păcală ("Păcală's Achievements") by Petre Dulfu; and Întâmplările lui Păcală ("The Adventures of Păcală"), part of Legende sau basmele românilor.

Păcală legends also served to inspire other creations, from the eponymous satirical magazine put out by Pantazi Ghica in the 1860s to Constantin S. Nicolăescu-Plopșor's 1960s sequel Tivisoc şi Tivismoc ("Tivisoc and Tivismoc"). He is the main protagonist in two Romanian films, both written and directed by Geo Saizescu; and inspired artist Sandu Florea to create his first comic strip (1968).

Fictional Romanian people
Romanian humour
Romanian mythology
Male characters in literature
Mythological tricksters
Romanian folklore
Humor and wit characters